The British Ambassador to France is the United Kingdom's foremost diplomatic representative in France, and is the head of Britain's diplomatic mission in Paris. The official title is His Majesty's Ambassador to France.

Traditionally, the Embassy to France has been the most prestigious posting in the British foreign service, although in past centuries, diplomatic representation was lacking due to wars between the two countries and the Nazi occupation.

For the period before the creation of the United Kingdom of Great Britain and Ireland in 1801, see List of ambassadors of the Kingdom of England to France (up to 1707) and List of ambassadors of Great Britain to France (from 1707 to 1800).

The Paris embassy also covers remotely the French overseas territories (including French Guiana, Guadeloupe, Martinique, Saint Pierre and Miquelon, Réunion, French Polynesia, Mayotte, Wallis and Futuna, New Caledonia, Saint-Barthélemy) and Monaco.

Besides the embassy, the Foreign & Commonwealth Office maintains consulates in Bordeaux and Marseille in southern France.

British Ambassadors and Ministers to France 

There was no representation of Great Britain or the United Kingdom in France from 1792 to 1801, due to the French Revolutionary Wars
1801–1802: The Marquess Cornwallis, Plenipotentiary
1802–1803: The Lord Whitworth
No representation from 1803 to 1814, due to the Napoleonic Wars
1806: Francis Seymour-Conway, Earl of Yarmouth and James Maitland, 8th Earl of Lauderdale, Plenipotentiaries 
1814–1815: The Duke of Wellington
1815–1824: Sir Charles Stuart
1824–1828: The Viscount Granville
1828–1830: The Lord Stuart de Rothesay
1830–1835: The Viscount Granville
1835: The Lord Cowley
1835–1841: The Earl Granville
1841–1846: The Lord Cowley
1846–1852: The Marquess of Normanby
1852–1867: The Earl Cowley
1867–1887: The Viscount Lyons
1887–1891: The Earl of Lytton
1891–1896: The Marquess of Dufferin and Ava
1896–1905: Sir Edmund Monson
1905–1918: Sir Francis Bertie
1918–1920: The Earl of Derby
1920–1922: The Lord Hardinge of Penshurst
1922–1928: The Marquess of Crewe
1928–1934: Sir William Tyrrell
1934–1937: Sir George Clerk
1937–1939: Sir Eric Phipps
1939–1940: Sir Ronald Hugh Campbell
No representation from 1940 to 1944, due to the German occupation of France during the Second World War
1944–1948: Sir Alfred Duff Cooper, (previously Representative to the Free French in Algiers from 1943)
1948–1954: Sir Oliver Harvey
1954–1960: Sir Gladwyn Jebb
1960–1965: Sir Pierson Dixon
1965–1968: Sir Patrick Reilly
1968–1972: Sir Christopher Soames
1972–1975: Sir Edward Tomkins
1975–1979: Sir Nicholas Henderson
1979–1982: Sir Reginald Hibbert
1982–1987: Sir John Fretwell
1987–1993: Sir Ewen Fergusson
1993–1996: Sir Christopher Mallaby
1996–2001: Sir Michael Jay
2001–2007: Sir John Holmes
2007–2012: Sir Peter Westmacott
2012–2015: Sir Peter Ricketts
2016–2016: Sir Julian King
2016–2021: Edward Llewellyn, Baron Llewellyn of Steep OBE

2021–: Dame Menna Rawlings

See also
 France–United Kingdom relations
 List of ambassadors of France to the United Kingdom since 1803
 Timeline of British diplomatic history

References

List of Ambassadors to France since 1814, British Embassy, France

External links
UK and France, gov.uk

France
United Kingdom